Nerijus Montvydas (born 21 January 1985) is a Lithuanian goalball player who competes in international elite events. He is a Paralympic champion and a four-time European champion.

References

1985 births
Living people
Sportspeople from Vilnius
Paralympic goalball players of Lithuania
Goalball players at the 2008 Summer Paralympics
Goalball players at the 2012 Summer Paralympics
Goalball players at the 2016 Summer Paralympics
Medalists at the 2008 Summer Paralympics
Medalists at the 2016 Summer Paralympics
Goalball players at the 2020 Summer Paralympics